The state of Mississippi is served by the following area codes:

 228, which serves the Gulf Coast region of Mississippi
 601/769, which serve most of southern Mississippi including Jackson
 662, which serves northern Mississippi

Area code list
 
Mississippi
Area codes